The Chevrolet D-20 (or 20 Series) is a series of pickup trucks manufactured by Chevrolet in Brazil and Argentina as a complement for the 10 Series. also belonging to the Chevrolet C/K pickup truck line, When it was first launched, it could be ordered with a 4.1L gasoline or ethanol engine (C-20 or A20, respectively) or a 3.9L Perkins diesel (D-20). In 1991, the Perkins was replaced with the Maxion S4 4.0L diesel making 66 kW (88 hp) and the turbocharged Maxion S4T making 92 kW (123 hp). In 1995, the S4T was readjusted to match the Euro-II emission limits, producing 110 kW (147 hp). This version was called Turbo Plus, and equipped with mechanical ABS in the rear. Whilst all models are commonly referred to as D-20, the gasoline model was marketed as the C-20, and an otherwise mechanically identical ethanol-fueled version as the A-20.

It was succeeded by Chevrolet Silverado, known in the US as fourth-generation C/K (C1500) 1997-2001.

As well as single-cab and crew-cab versions, Chevrolet sold mechanically identical SUVs, called Bonanza (similar to the Blazer or 2-door Tahoe) and Veraneio (similar to the Suburban).

References

D-20
Pickup trucks
Cars of Argentina
Cars of Brazil